The Teatro Grande is the main performance venue for the city of Brescia, Italy. The venue hosts performances of operas, musicals, plays, concerts, ballet, modern dance, and other various entertainments.

External links
Official website

Opera houses in Italy
Buildings and structures in Brescia